Søm Church is a parish church of the Church of Norway in Kristiansand Municipality in Agder county, Norway. It is located in the district of Søm in the borough of Oddernes in the city of Kristiansand. It is one of the churches for the Randesund parish which is part of the Kristiansand domprosti (arch-deanery) in the Diocese of Agder og Telemark. The red brick church was built in a fan-shaped design in 2004 using plans drawn up by the architects Arild Lauvland and Arne Åmland. The church seats about 450 people, but it can be expanded to seat up to about 650 people.

History
The foundation stone was laid in January 2000 and over the next few years, the church was constructed. The church was consecrated on 28 November 2004.

Interior art
The stained glass windows were made by artist Kjell Nupen on the theme: "From darkness to light". The stained glass extends from the altar up to the ceiling and through the nave to the front door. The side windows have stained glass as well.

One large and several smaller tapestries were created by textile artist Else Marie Jakobsen.

Media gallery

See also
List of churches in Agder og Telemark

References

External links
 
Photographs by architect Arne Åmland

Churches in Kristiansand
Brick churches in Norway
21st-century Church of Norway church buildings
Churches completed in 2004
2004 establishments in Norway